The blackbanded darter (Percina nigrofasciata) is a species of freshwater ray-finned fish, a darter from the subfamily Etheostomatinae, part of the family Percidae, which also contains the perches, ruffes and pikeperches. It is native to the river systems of the southeastern United States where it is found in the states of South Carolina, Tennessee, Georgia, Florida, Mississippi, Alabama, and Louisiana. It lives over sandy or gravelly bottoms in smaller rivers and streams and its color varies depending on the different habitats in which it lives. It feeds on small insect larvae and is itself preyed on by larger fish. It spawns between February and June depending on locality. It is a common fish throughout most of its range but is rare in the Altamaha River in Georgia.

Description
The body of the fish is variable and is influenced by the surrounding habitat. The blackbanded darter will be a light color if it is found along a sandy substrate. The darters that have a dark color are usually found around leaf litter, sticks, and aquatic vegetation.  Breeding males have a greenish blue wash over their body and the head is brownish gold color.  The blackbanded darter can be confused with the dusky darter (Percina sciera).

Distribution and habitat
The blackbanded darter inhabits many river systems in the United States. They are found in the Atlantic drainage as well as the Gulf of Mexico drainage in the southeastern United States (South Carolina, Tennessee, Georgia, Florida, Mississippi, Alabama, and Louisiana).  They can be found in the Santee River in South Carolina all the way over to the western part of the Mississippi River tributaries in Louisiana. Their range goes as far south as Lake Okeechobee in Central Florida. The blackbanded darter is the most common darter throughout its range. The blackbanded darter is absent from the Satilla River and the St. Marys River in southeast Georgia and northern Florida. In the Altamaha River, located in central and south Georgia, the blackbanded darter is considered rare.

Ecology
The blackbanded darter is found in headwaters to medium-sized rivers over gravel and sand substrates. Blackbanded darters tend to live in intermediate microhabitat that has more erosional substrata and greater variety of depth. The primary predators for the blackbanded darter are stonecats, largemouth bass, and other larger freshwater fish species.

Life History
Blackbanded darter spawns between February to June. Spawning occurs in sandy bottoms around a stream channel.  The male approaches a female from the rear. Once on the female, he mounts her and beats her with his pelvic fin. The average clutch size for the blackbanded darter depends on the location. In Florida, a clutch size range from 4 to 73 eggs, while in Alabama, the range is from 38 to 250 eggs. In Alabama, the sex ratio of the eggs favors male over females. After the eggs are laid, there is no parental care. The life span of the blackbanded darter is estimated to be around three to four years. The life history of the blackbanded darter depends on geographic variation in environmental condition such as photoperiod and water temperature. Pollution and siltation can cause temperature change of the water which will affect when the darter will spawn.

Management
The blackbanded darter is not endangered or threatened in its range. They are listed as least concern. In many areas of the southeastern United States where they inhabit, they are most abundant fish in river, but the blackbanded darter is rare in the Altamaha River which is located in the state of Georgia.

References

Freshwater fish of the Southeastern United States
Percina
Fish described in 1854